Larry Bowie (October 13, 1939 – December 31, 2012) was a National Football League guard. He was drafted by the Minnesota Vikings in the sixth round of the 1962 NFL Draft. He played college football at Purdue.

References

1939 births
American football offensive guards
Purdue Boilermakers football players
Minnesota Vikings players
2012 deaths